The 2018 Division 1, part of the 2018 Swedish football season was the 13th season of Sweden's third-tier football league in its current format. The 2018 fixtures were released in December 2017. The season started on 7 April 2018 and ended on 10 November 2018.

Teams
32 teams contest the league divided into two divisions, Norra and Södra. 28 returning from the 2017 season, two relegated from Superettan and two promoted from Division 2. The champion of each division will qualify directly for promotion to Superettan, the two runners-up has to play a play-off against the thirteenth and fourteenth team from Superettan to decide who will play in Superettan 2019. The bottom three teams in each division will qualify directly for relegation to Division 2.

Stadia and locations

Norra

Södra

League tables

Norra

Norra Results

Södra

Södra Results

Playoffs
The 13th-placed teams of each division meets the best two runners-up from 2018 Division 2 in two-legged ties on a home-and-away basis with the team from Division 1 finishing at home.

Karlslunds IF won 3–2 on aggregate.

FC Trollhättan won 4–3 on aggregate.

Season statistics

Top scorers - Norra

Top scorers - Södra

References

Swedish Football Division 1 seasons
3
Sweden